Good Nature may refer to:

 Good Nature (Youthmovies album)
 Good Nature (Turnover album)

See also
 Good Natured, a book by primatologist Frans de Waal